Birgit Senff is a retired German artistic gymnast. In 1981 she won a silver medal in the vault at the European Championships and a team bronze at the world championships. She missed the 1984 Summer Olympics due to their boycott by the Soviet block and competed at the Friendship Games instead, winning a silver medal with the East German team.

Nationally, she won the vault in 1981, 1983 and 1984 and the uneven bars in 1984.

References

Living people
German female artistic gymnasts
Medalists at the World Artistic Gymnastics Championships
Year of birth missing (living people)